Agnolo Pandolfini (1360-1446) was a Florentine statesman, merchant and Renaissance humanist. 

He was considered a highly learned man, erudite in Latin and a friend to most of the learned Florentines of his era. Leonardo Bruni was said to have published nothing which had not first obtained a favorable review from Agnolo. His erudition and high standing in Florentine society is evinced by his appearance as the chief speaker in two dialogues of his day: Della vita civile by Matteo Palmieri, and Della tranquilità dell'animo by Leon Battista Alberti. He was related by marriage to many of the leading families of Florence.

Origin and political life 
His grandfather, Ser Giovanni, moved from Signa to Florence around the beginning of the 14th century and was a notary. His son, Agnolo's father, named Filippo, was a wealthy merchant of the Por Santa Maria guild who probably dealt in silks and spices; he later joined the Signoria of Florence and, in 1393 and in 1400, became Gonfalonier.

Agnolo himself served in many political offices, becoming a major figure of the first half of the 15th century in Florence. He was Gonfalonier on three occasions, a member of the  twice, and was often invited to participate in executive councils, the so-called Consulte e Pratiche.

Literature 
 Martines, Lauro (2011). The Social World of the Florentine Humanists, 1390-1460. University of Toronto Press. pp. 313-314.

1360 births
1446 deaths
Politicians from Florence
Italian Renaissance humanists